TrSS Greenore was a steam turbine passenger and cargo vessel operated by the London and North Western Railway from 1912 to 1923, and the London, Midland and Scottish Railway from 1923 to 1926.

History

She was built by Cammell Laird for the London and North Western Railway in 1912 and put on the Holyhead - Greenore route to replace the paddle steamer Edith.

She was the only London and North Western Railway to be equipped with the Direct-Drive Triple-Screw arrangement.

She was scrapped in 1926.

References

1912 ships
Steamships
Ships built on the River Mersey
Ships of the London and North Western Railway
Ships of the London, Midland and Scottish Railway